USS Octorara is a name used more than once by the U.S. Navy:

 , a steamer in the Union Navy during the American Civil War.
 , a tanker built in 1921.

Octorara